Mirror is a 1975 Russian drama film directed by Andrei Tarkovsky. It is loosely autobiographical, unconventionally structured, and incorporates poems composed and read by the director's father, Arseny Tarkovsky. The film features Margarita Terekhova, Ignat Daniltsev, Alla Demidova, Anatoly Solonitsyn, Tarkovsky's wife Larisa Tarkovskaya and his mother Maria Vishnyakova. Innokenty Smoktunovsky provides voiceover and Eduard Artemyev the incidental music and sound effects.

Mirror is structured in the form of a nonlinear narrative, with its main concept dating back to 1964 and undergoing multiple scripted versions by Tarkovsky and Aleksandr Misharin. It unfolds around memories recalled by a dying poet of key moments in his life and in Soviet culture. The film combines contemporary scenes with childhood memories, dreams, and newsreel footage. Its cinematography slips between color, black-and-white, and sepia. The film's loose flow of oneiric images has been compared with the stream of consciousness technique associated with modernist literature.

Mirror initially polarized critics and audiences, with many finding its narrative incomprehensible. Since its release, it has been reappraised as one of the greatest films of all time, as well as Tarkovsky's magnum opus. It has especially found favor with many Russians, for whom it remains their most beloved of Tarkovsky's works.

Plot

Structure and content
Mirror depicts the thoughts, emotions and memories of Aleksei, or Alyosha (Ignat Daniltsev), and the world around him as a child, adolescent, and 40-year-old. The adult Aleksei is only briefly glimpsed, but is present as a voice-over in some scenes including substantial dialogue. The film's structure is discontinuous and nonchronological, without a conventional plot, and combines incidents, dreams, memories, and newsreel footage. The film switches among three different time frames: prewar (1935), wartime (1940s), and postwar (1960s or '70s).

Mirror draws heavily on Tarkovsky's own childhood. Memories such as the evacuation from Moscow to the countryside during the war, a withdrawn father and his own mother, who worked as a proofreader at a printing press, feature prominently.

Synopsis
The film opens with Aleksei's adolescent son Ignat switching on a television and watching the examination of a man with a stutter by a physician who finally manages to make her patient say without disruption: "I can talk". After the opening titles, a scene is set in the countryside during prewar times in which Aleksei's mother Maria, also called Masha and Marusya, speaks with a doctor who chances to be passing by. The exterior and interior of Aleksei's grandfather's country house are seen. The young Aleksei, his mother and sister watch as the family barn burns down. In a dream sequence, Maria is washing her hair.

In the postwar time frame, Aleksei is heard talking with his mother on the phone while rooms of an apartment are seen. Switching back to the prewar time frame, Maria is seen rushing frantically to her workplace as a proofreader at a printing press. She is worried about a mistake she may have overlooked, but is comforted by her colleague Liza (Alla Demidova), who then seemingly reduces her to tears with withering criticism. Back in the postwar period, Aleksei quarrels with his ex-wife, Natalia, who has divorced him and is living with their son Ignat. This is followed by newsreel scenes from the Spanish Civil War and of a balloon ascent in the U.S.S.R.

In the next scene, in Aleksei's apartment, Ignat meets with a strange woman sitting at a table. At her request, Ignat reads a passage from a letter by Pushkin and receives a telephone call from his father Aleksei. Ignat answers a knock at the door, which turns out to be a woman who says she has the wrong apartment. When Ignat returns to the woman at the table, she has vanished, though the condensation from her teacup momentarily remains. Switching to wartime, the adolescent Aleksei is seen undergoing rifle training with a dour instructor, intercut with newsreel footage of World War II and the Sino-Soviet border conflict. Before the war, Maria visits her neighbor with Aleksei to seek toiletries. The woman introduces Maria to her son and requests she slaughter a cockerel, which she does.

Aleksei and his sister reunite with their father at the war's end. The film then returns to the quarrel between Aleksei and his wife in the postwar sequence. Switching again to prewar time, vistas of the country house and surrounding countryside are followed by a dreamlike sequence showing a levitating Maria. The film then moves to the postwar time, showing Aleksei apparently on his deathbed with a mysterious malady and holding a small bird. The final scene is in the prewar time frame, showing a pregnant Maria intercut with scenes showing Maria young and old. (Old Maria is played by Tarkovsky's mother, Maria Vishnyakova.)

Cast
Several of the characters are played by the same actors.
 Filipp Yankovsky as the child Aleksei
 Ignat Daniltsev as the adolescent Aleksei and Ignat, Aleksei's son
 Innokenty Smoktunovsky as the adult Aleksei (voice only)
 Margarita Terekhova as the young Maria/Masha/Marusya (Aleksei's mother) and Natalia (Aleksei's wife)
 Maria Vishnyakova (Tarkovsky's real-life mother) as the elderly Maria
 Oleg Yankovsky as Aleksei's father
 Alla Demidova as Liza, Maria's friend at printing house
 Anatoly Solonitsyn as forensic doctor, the passerby
Nikolai Grinko as printing house director
Yuriy Nazarov as military instructor
 Tamara Ogorodnikova as nanny and strange woman at the tea table
 Larisa Tarkovskaya as Nadezhda, Aleksei's neighbor
 Arseny Tarkovsky as narrator/poet (voice only)
 Ilene Woods as Scrub woman
 Olga Kizilova as the redhead

Production

Writing
The concept of Mirror dates to 1964, when Tarkovsky wrote down his idea for a film about the dreams and memories of a man, without the man appearing on screen. The first episodes of Mirror were written while Tarkovsky was working on Andrei Rublev. These episodes were published in 1970 as a short story titled A White Day. The title was taken from a 1942 poem by his father, Arseny Tarkovsky. In 1968, after finishing Andrei Rublev, Tarkovsky went to the cinematographer's resort in Repino intending to write the script for The Mirror with Aleksandr Misharin. This script was titled Confession and was proposed to the film committee at Goskino. Although it contained popular themes such as a heroic mother, the war, and patriotism, the proposal was rejected. The main reason was most likely the complex and unconventional script. Moreover, Tarkovsky and Misharin clearly stated that they did not know what the film's final form would be; this was to be determined in the process of filming.

With the script rejected by the film committee, Tarkovsky went on to make the film Solaris. But his diary entries show that he was still eager to make the film. Finally, the new head of Goskino, Filipp Ermash, approved the script in the summer of 1973. Tarkovsky was given a budget of 622,000 Rbls and 7,500 metres (24,606 feet) of Kodak film, corresponding to 110 minutes, or roughly three takes, assuming a film length of 3,000 metres (10,000 feet).

Several versions of the script for Mirror exist, as Tarkovsky constantly rewrote parts of it, with the latest variant written in 1974 while he was in Italy. One scene that was in the script but removed during shooting was an interview with his mother. Tarkovsky wanted to use a hidden camera to interview her on the pretext that it was research for the film. This scene was one of the main reasons Vadim Yusov, the cameraman for all of Tarkovsky's previous films, refused to work with him on this film. At various times, the script and the film were titled Confession, Redemption, Martyrology, Why are you standing so far away?, The Raging Stream and A White, White Day (sometimes also translated as A Bright, Bright Day). While filming, Tarkovsky decided to title the film Mirror. The film features several mirrors, with some scenes shot in reflection.

A poster of Tarkovsky's 1969 film Andrei Rublev is seen on a wall. Mirror is the third film in a series in which Tarkovsky references Andrei Rublev, along with his eponymous 1969 film and Solaris (1972), in which a bust of the painter is seen in the main character's room.

Casting
Initially, Tarkovsky considered Alla Demidova and Swedish actress Bibi Andersson for the role of the mother. In the end, he chose Margarita Terekhova.

Filming
Principal photography began in July 1973 and ended in March 1974. Outdoor scenes were shot in Tutshkovo, near Moscow, and indoor scenes were shot at the Mosfilm studio. The film's naturalist style required Terekhova to forego makeup.

Filipp Ermash initially rejected the film in July 1974. One reason was that it was incomprehensible. Tarkovsky was infuriated by the rejection and toyed with the idea of making a film outside the Soviet Union. Goskino ultimately approved Mirror without any changes in fall 1974.

Release

Mirror never had an official premiere and had only a limited, second category release with only 73 copies. Although it was officially announced for September 1975, it was shown as early as March 1975.

Reception and legacy
When Mosfilm critics were asked in November 1974 to evaluate Mirror, responses were divided. Some viewed it as a major work that would be better understood by future generations; others dismissed it as an unfocused failure and believed that even more cultured viewers would find its story opaque. This resulted in very limited distribution. Many audience members walked out of theatrical screenings, but those who liked the film were ardent in their praise. In a 1975 New York Times article, James F. Clarity wrote, "in the first round of published reviews, in which some of Mr. Tarkovsky's fellow film makers evaluated his new work, there is much praise, tempered with criticism of some parts of the film." Goskino did not allow it to be shown at the Cannes Film Festival. The managing director of the festival, Maurice Bessy, was sympathetic to Tarkovsky. Upon hearing that Mirror would not be allowed to be shown in Cannes, he unsuccessfully threatened not to take any other Soviet film.

Mirror has an approval rating of 100% on review aggregator website Rotten Tomatoes, based on 23 reviews, and an average rating of 9.1/10.

Mirror is frequently listed among the greatest films of all time. In a 2012 Sight & Sound directors' poll, Mirror ranked as the ninth greatest film of all time. In a parallel poll by film critics, the film ranks 19th. Filmmaker Ashim Ahluwalia included the film in his personal top ten (for The Sight & Sound Top 50 Greatest Films of All Time poll), writing: "Mirror offers epic hypnotherapy and some of the most beautiful celluloid ever shot." For the same poll, Will Self argued that it remains "the most beautiful film ever made". Peter Bradshaw of The Guardian called it "a startling piece of film-making" and many of its images "transcendentally brilliant". In the British Film Institute, the film is billed as "a work of cumulative, rhythmic effect" and its unconventional narrative is credited with having "pioneered a poetic and richly allusive form." Director Michael Haneke voted for Mirror in the 2002 Sight & Sound directors' poll (where the film ranked 16th) and later said that he has seen it at least 25 times. In the 2002 Critics poll it ranked 35th. In 2018 the film ranked 20th on the BBC's list of the 100 greatest foreign-language films, as voted on by 209 film critics from 43 countries.

Interpretation

While highly acclaimed, Mirror continues to be viewed as enigmatic. Natasha Synessios wrote that it is closer in structure to a musical piece than a narrative film, noting that Tarkovsky "always maintained that he used the laws of music as the film's organisational principle...emphasis placed not on the logic, but the form, of the flow of events." Critic Antti Alanen called the film a "space odyssey into the interior of the psyche" and Tarkovsky's In Search of Lost Time. Howard Hampton argued that the work's central subject is "the inescapable persistence of the past."

Notes

References

Bibliography

External links
 
 
 The Mirror at official Mosfilm site with English subtitles
 Poems of Arseny Tarkovsky recited in the film 
 Voted #16 on The Arts and Faith Top 100 Films (2010)
Mirror: “All Is Immortal” an essay by Carmen Gray at the Criterion Collection

1975 films
1970s Russian-language films
1970s Spanish-language films
1975 in the Soviet Union
1970s avant-garde and experimental films
1975 drama films
Soviet avant-garde and experimental films
Soviet drama films
Russian drama films
Films directed by Andrei Tarkovsky
Films scored by Eduard Artemyev
Films set in Russia
Films set in 1935
Films set in the 1940s
Films set in 1969
Films shot in Moscow Oblast
Existentialist films
Films about mother–son relationships
Non-narrative films
Russian avant-garde and experimental films
Russian nonlinear narrative films
Mosfilm films